The Grand Prix Gazipaşa is a one-day road cycling race held in Turkey. It is part of UCI Europe Tour in category 1.2.

Winners

References

2019 establishments in Turkey
Cycle races in Turkey
Recurring sporting events established in 2019
UCI Europe Tour races